Let's Get Crazy may refer to:

"Let's Get Crazy" (Cassie song)
"Let's Get Crazy" (Hannah Montana song)
"Let's Get Crazy", a song by Quiet Riot from Metal Health
"Let's Get Crazy", a song by White Lion from Big Game

See also
"Let's Go Crazy", a song by Prince and The Revolution
"Let's Go Crazy", a song by The Clash from Sandinista!
Get Crazy, a 1983 film directed by Allan Arkush